Madison County is a county located in the U.S. state of Idaho. As of the 2020 census, the population was 52,913. The county seat and largest city is Rexburg.

Madison County is part of the Rexburg, Idaho micropolitan area, which is also included in the Idaho Falls metropolitan area.

History
The area was originally settled by members of the Church of Jesus Christ of Latter-day Saints. Before February 1913, the county was part of neighboring Fremont County. The newly established county was named for American president James Madison. Brigham Young University–Idaho, formerly Ricks College (named after early local LDS settler Thomas Edwin Ricks) is located in Madison County. Madison County was declared a national disaster area after the flood of June 5, 1976.

Madison County is the owner of the healthcare system in the region. However, it is contracted out to Madison Memorial. Madison Memorial began in 1951 when the doctors at that time decided it was time for the community to have a hospital. They then closed their practices and collaborated with the community to build Madison Memorial, a non-profit healthcare system. Since that time, Madison Memorial has continued to grow, promote population health for the region, and provide professional healthcare services for the region with over 800 employees. The region served includes the following counties Jefferson, Madison, Fremont, Teton, Clark, and Lemhi. Madison Memorial is the nearest hospital to Yellowstone National Park.

Government and politics
Similar to other Idaho counties, an elected three-member county commission heads the county government. Other elected officials include clerk, treasurer, sheriff, assessor, coroner, and prosecutor.

With a strongly conservative population, Madison County is one of the most staunchly Republican counties in the United States. Since 1968 no Republican presidential candidate has failed to carry the county with less than 56 percent of the vote, and no Democratic presidential nominee has cracked 23 percent thereof. In that same period Republican presidential candidates polled more than 90 percent of the county's vote on three occasions, Ronald Reagan in 1984, George W. Bush in 2004, and Mitt Romney in 2012. John McCain came close to this level in 2008, drawing 85 percent of the vote. In 2016, Donald Trump won the county, but performed far worse in it than Republicans typically do: he received just 57 percent of the vote, while Romney had received over 93 percent of the vote there four years earlier. However, this is attributed to the county also gave Evan McMullin almost thirty percent of the vote in 2016, which was his best performance of any county in the entire country that year.

In 2020, Trump won 79% of the vote, 22 points up from 2016. However this was still a lower vote share than those achieved by Republican candidates George W Bush in 2000 and 2004, John McCain in 2008 and Mitt Romney in 2012.

Joe Biden won 15.6%, up 7.9% from Hillary Clinton's vote share in 2016. Biden's vote share was the highest for a Democrat in a presidential race in this county since 1996. It was also one of just four times since Lyndon Johnson's 1964 landslide that a Democrat exceeded 15% (the others being the aforementioned 1996, as well as Jimmy Carter in 1976 and Hubert Humphrey in 1968). 

At the state level Madison County is located in Legislative District 34, which currently has an all-Republican delegation in the Idaho Legislature.

Geography
It is the third-smallest county in Idaho by area.

Adjacent counties
 Fremont County - north
 Teton County - east
 Bonneville County - south
 Jefferson County - west

Major highways
 US 20
 SH-33

National protected area
 Targhee National Forest (part)

Demographics

2000 census
As of the census of 2000, there were 27,467 people, 7,129 households, and 4,854 families living in the county. There were 7,630 housing units at an average density of 16 per square mile (6/km2). The racial makeup of the county was 95.50% White, 0.24% Black or African American, 0.33% Native American, 0.57% Asian, 0.18% Pacific Islander, 2.23% from other races, and 0.95% from two or more races. 3.92% of the population were Hispanic or Latino of any race. 30.6% were of English, 10.7% German, 10.2% American and 5.3% Danish ancestry.

There were 7,129 households, out of which 39.00% had children under the age of 18 living with them, 60.10% were married couples living together, 5.70% had a female householder with no husband present, and 31.90% were non-families. 12.70% of all households were made up of individuals, and 5.60% had someone living alone who was 65 years of age or older. The average household size was 3.66 and the average family size was 3.70.

In the county, the population was spread out, with 26.20% under the age of 18, 39.90% from 18 to 24, 16.00% from 25 to 44, 11.90% from 45 to 64, and 6.00% who were 65 years of age or older. The median age was 21 years. For every 100 females, there were 90.90 males. For every 100 females age 18 and over, there were 83.60 males.

The median income for a household in the county was $32,607, and the median income for a family was $40,880. Males had a median income of $29,299 versus $18,628 for females. The per capita income for the county was $10,956. About 10.10% of families and 30.50% of the population were below the poverty line, including 11.70% of those under age 18 and 10.10% of those age 65 or over.

2010 census
As of the 2010 United States Census, there were 37,536 people, 10,611 households, and 7,887 families living in the county. The racial makeup of the county was 93.9% white, 0.9% Asian, 0.5% Black or African American, 0.3% American Indian, 0.1% Pacific islander, 2.8% from other races, and 1.5% from two or more races. Those of Hispanic or Latino origin made up 5.9% of the population. In terms of ancestry, 35.9% were English, 14.8% were German, 6.0% were Danish, 5.7% were American, and 5.4% were Irish.

Of the 10,611 households, 38.8% had children under the age of 18 living with them, 67.6% were married couples living together, 4.8% had a female householder with no husband present, 25.7% were non-families, and 10.1% of all households were made up of individuals. The average household size was 3.44 and the average family size was 3.42. The median age was 22.6 years.

Madison County had the lowest median household income in the state of Idaho; household in the county was $35,461 and the median income for a family was $41,117. Males had a median income of $38,398 versus $22,440 for females. The per capita income for the county was $13,735. About 21.4% of families and 32.2% of the population were below the poverty line, including 20.9% of those under age 18 and 10.1% of those age 65 or over.

Communities

Cities
 Rexburg
 Sugar City

Unincorporated communities
 Archer
 Burton
 Thornton
 Hibbard

See also
National Register of Historic Places listings in Madison County, Idaho

References

External links
County website

 

 
Idaho counties
Rexburg, Idaho micropolitan area
1913 establishments in Idaho
Populated places established in 1913